Roy Lloyd Shattuck (June 2, 1871 – August 15, 1915) was an Indiana politician. In 1914 he was the Republican candidate for Indiana's 5th congressional district, running against Ralph Wilbur Moss.

Biography
He was born on June 2, 1871 to Volney B. Shattuck and Henrietta Bessie Pearce in Clay County, Indiana. On November 7, 1894 he married Olive Rosamond Carter. He died on August 15, 1915 in Brazil, Indiana.

References

1871 births
1915 deaths
Indiana Republicans
People from Clay County, Indiana
People from Brazil, Indiana
American Freemasons